Amarochara is a genus of beetles belonging to the family Staphylinidae.

The genus was first described by Thomson in 1858.

The species of this genus are found in Europe and Northern America.

Species:
 Amarochara forticornis (Lacordaire, 1835)

References

Aleocharinae
Staphylinidae genera